Mats Svensson (born 28 April 1943) is a retired Swedish freestyle swimmer. He competed at the 1964 Summer Olympics in the 400 m and 4 × 200 m events and finished fifth in the relay. He won a gold and a bronze medal in the 4 × 100 m and 4 × 200 m relays at the 1962 European Aquatics Championships.

References

1943 births
Living people
Swedish male freestyle swimmers
Olympic swimmers of Sweden
Swimmers at the 1964 Summer Olympics
European Aquatics Championships medalists in swimming
People from Borås
Sportspeople from Västra Götaland County